Enter Shikari are a British rock band formed in 2003. Their debut album, Take to the Skies, was released on 19 March 2007 and reached number 4 in the UK Albums Chart. The album was later certified Gold. Their second album, titled Common Dreads, was released on 15 June 2009 and peaked at  number 16. Their third studio album A Flash Flood of Colour was released on 16 January 2012 and debuted at number 4. Their fourth studio album The Mindsweep was released on 19 January 2015 to critical acclaim.

Albums

Studio albums

Compilation albums

Remix albums

Live albums

Extended plays

Singles

Promotional singles

Remixes
There have been numerous remixes of Enter Shikari songs:

Videography

Video albums 
2007 – Live at the Astoria (bonus DVD with Take to the Skies)
2011 – Live from Planet Earth - Bootleg Series Volume 3
2012 – Phenakistiscope (bonus DVD with A Flash Flood of Colour)
2012 – Live in London. W6. March 2012. - Bootleg Series Volume 4
2013 – Live in the Barrowland - Bootleg Series Volume 5
2015 – Live in St. Petersburg, Russia - Bootleg Series Volume 6 (bonus DVD with The Mindsweep)
2015 – Live at Woodstock, Poland 2013 + Live at Download Festival, UK 2013 (bonus DVD with The Mindsweep)

Music videos

As featured artist

Notes

References
A  "Slipshod (Urbandawn Remix)" did not enter the UK Singles Chart, but peaked at number 3 on the UK Physical Singles chart and at number 2 on the UK Vinyl Singles chart.

Discographies of British artists
Post-hardcore group discographies
discog